Albert Whiting (31 May 1866 – 19 March 1946) was an Australian cricketer. He played one first-class match for New South Wales in 1886/87.

See also
 List of New South Wales representative cricketers

References

External links
 

1866 births
1946 deaths
Australian cricketers
New South Wales cricketers
Cricketers from Sydney